Jeevana Tarangalu is a 1973 Indian Telugu-language drama film directed by T. Rama Rao. The film stars Sobhan Babu, Krishnam Raju, Vanisri, Chandramohan, and Lakshmi. It is based on a novel by Yaddanapudi Sulochana Rani, and won three Filmfare Awards South. It was remade in Tamil as Thirumangalyam (1974), in Hindi in as Dil Aur Deewaar (1978), and in Kannada as Mangalya (1991).

Plot 
Venu Gopala Rao (Gummadi) and Savitri (Sriranjani) are a couple with two children, Roja (Vanisri) and Chandu (Krishnam Raju). But unfortunately, Venu Gopala Rao has an affair with another woman and leaves his family and children to marry her. He has two children from the second wife, namely Lavanya (Lakshmi) and a polio-affected younger daughter. Savitri faces a lot of insults from her brother and sister-in-law (Raavi Kondala Rao, Suryakantham) and lives with them because she has no shelter. Roja teaches music and Chandu is a spoiled brat who joins a theft group with an alias name, James. Meanwhile, Venu Gopala Rao's sister (Santakumari) is a rich woman and her stepson Vijay (Sobhan Babu) is a lawyer by profession and a responsible citizen at heart. Her own son Ananth (Chandramohan) is a laid-back person. Though he is good-natured, but irresponsible. Venu Gopala Rao's sister bestows Ananth's responsibility on Vijay and also gives him her property.

As a result, Vijay looks after Ananth with utmost care and affection. Ananth meets Roja in a party once and the latter treats him more like a brother. But Ananth mistakes her affections to be something else. Meanwhile, Vijay decides for Ananth to marry Venu Gopala Rao's daughter Lavanya. This marriage isn't liked by either Ananth or Lavanya. Lavanya is an ultra-modern woman who is into clubs and promiscuity.  She doesn't bother her father also in this regard. Ananth requests Roja to help her to come out of this marriage plan because his brother insists for the same. Roja helps Ananth out of friendship and writes a fake letter without any name mentioned. But because of this, she gets into deep trouble. Ananth mistakes Roja's help as love and plans to marry her in secret. Vijay who always objected the friendship between Ananth and Roja marries an unconscious Roja in dramatic circumstances. Roja's life gets miserable and incidentally she joins as a nanny in Venu Gopala Rao's house unaware that they are daughter-father respectively. She faces trouble seeing Vijay who often comes to their house. The rest of the film deals with how Vijay helps Roja out of four different problems – Forcible marriage, her brother Chandu who is into robberies, Lavanya who hates her, and her bedridden mother.

Cast 
 Sobhan Babu... Vijay
 Krishnamraju... Chandram
 Vanisree... Roja
 Chandramohan... Ananth
 Anjali Devi
 Lakshmi... Lavanya
 Gummadi... Venugopal Rao
Padmanabham as Anji
Ramana Reddy
Suryakantham
 Sriranjani
Santha Kumari
Raavi Kondala Rao
Rajanala as Pundarikakshaiah
Nalla Ramamurthy as Astrologer

Soundtrack 

 "Ee Andaniki Bandham Vesanokanaadu" (Singers: Ghantasala and P. Susheela)
 "Ee Jeevana Tarangalalo Aa Devuni Chadarangamlo" (Singer: Ghantasala)
 "Nandamaya Guruda Nandamaya" (Lyrics: C. Narayana Reddy; Singer: L. R. Eswari)
 "Puttina Roju Panduge Andariki" (Lyrics: C. Narayana Reddy; Singer: P. Susheela)
 "Thenchukuntala Unchukuntava" (Singers: P. Susheela and L. R. Eswari)
 "Uduta Uduta Huth Ekkadikelatavuch" (Singers: Ghantasala and Ramola)

Box office 
 The film ran more than 100 days in 12 centers in Andhra Pradesh.

Awards 

 Filmfare Best Film Award (Telugu) – D.Rama Naidu
 Filmfare Best Director Award (Telugu) – T. Rama Rao
 Filmfare Best Actress Award (Telugu) – Vanisri

References

External links 
 

1970s Telugu-language films
1973 drama films
1973 films
Films based on novels by Yaddanapudi Sulochana Rani
Films directed by T. Rama Rao
Films scored by J. V. Raghavulu
Indian drama films
Suresh Productions films
Telugu films remade in other languages